Davor Radmanović (born 12 September 1957) is a Croatian retired football player.

Career
Born in Rijeka, he is originally from Labin. As a player, he spent much of his career (eight seasons) playing for his hometown team, HNK Rijeka. He was one of the club's most important midfielders during the mid-1980s. For the club, he scored important goals in the 1986–87 Yugoslav Cup final against Hajduk Split, and in the 1986-87 UEFA Cup game against Standard Liège. From Rijeka he moved to Spain, where he played for seven years until the end of his career. He played for four clubs, including Hércules CF and Alicante CF.

Honours
NK Rijeka
Yugoslav Cup: 1978

NK Maribor
Slovenian Republic Cup: 1979

Statistics

Club

References

External links
 
 PlayerHistory profile

1957 births
Living people
Footballers from Rijeka
People from Labin
Yugoslav footballers
Croatian footballers
Association football midfielders
HNK Rijeka players
NK Maribor players
Hércules CF players
Orihuela Deportiva CF footballers
Alicante CF footballers
Yugoslav First League players
Segunda División players
Segunda División B players
Tercera División players
Yugoslav expatriate footballers
Expatriate footballers in Spain
Yugoslav expatriate sportspeople in Spain
Croatian expatriate footballers
Croatian expatriate sportspeople in Spain
Croatian football managers
CD Eldense managers
Croatian expatriate football managers
Expatriate football managers in Spain